Çığlıca is a village in the Beytüşşebap District of Şırnak Province in Turkey. The village is populated by Kurds of the Mamxûran tribe and had a population of 537 in 2021.

The five hamlets of Baklan, Emekli, Eşme, Kayabaşı and Yoğurtlu are attached to Çığlıca.

References 

Villages in Beytüşşebap District
Kurdish settlements in Şırnak Province